Pénicaud is a surname. Notable people with the surname include:

Cédric Pénicaud (born 1971), French swimmer
Éric Pénicaud (born 1952), French classical composer, classical guitarist, and improviser
Muriel Pénicaud (born 1955), French human resources professional and minister
René Pénicaud (1843—1899), French politician and lawyer